Fevzipaşa is a town in Gaziantep Province, Turkey. It is inhabited by Yörüks.

Geography 

Fevzipaşa is a part of İslahiye district of Gaziantep Province. The Nur Mountains are just to the west of the town and the meadow-lands of Amik are to the east. The road from Fevzipaşa to the west is very steep and crooked, therefore usually the longer road to the north which connects Adana to Gaziantep is preferred. The population was 2415 as of 2012.

Economy 

Agriculture is one of the main activities.  The town is also known as a railroad town, because of the position of the town on the railroad junction.  The railroad from west (via one of the longest tunnels of Turkish railroads) merge with the line traverses Amik plains from north to south, down to Damascus, the Syrian capital. Fevzipaşa railroad station is an important station and many Fevzipaşa residents make their living as railroad employees.

References 

Populated places in Gaziantep Province
Towns in Turkey
İslahiye District